Daniel Joulani (born 19 March 2003), also known as Daniel Golani, is a professional footballer who plays as a forward for Maccabi Petah Tikva. Born in Israel, he has represented Ukraine at youth level.

International career
Joulani's mother was born and raised in Ukraine. He is a youth international for Ukraine.

Career statistics

Club

Notes

References

2003 births
Living people
Ukrainian footballers
Israeli footballers
Association football forwards
Maccabi Petah Tikva F.C. players
Liga Leumit players
Israeli Premier League players
Ukraine youth international footballers
Israeli people of Ukrainian-Jewish descent